Amyntas, son of Arrhabaeus, was hipparch  of the ile of Prodromoi. He replaced Hegelochus and was replaced by Protomachus.

References
Who's Who in the Age of Alexander the Great by  Waldemar Heckel 

Ancient Greek generals
Ancient Macedonian generals
Ancient Lyncestians